Derek Byerlee  (born 30 April 1946) is an Australian agricultural researcher, economist and policy advisor.

He has held senior positions at Michigan State University, the International Maize and Wheat Improvement Center and the World Bank.

Byerlee was the lead author of the World Bank's World Development Report 2008.

Byerlee was appointed as an Officer of the Order of Australia in the 2019 Queen's Birthday Honours.

Byerlee said his interest in agriculture began in his childhood while growing up on a sheep and wheat farm near Eurelia in South Australia.

References 

1946 births
Living people
Officers of the Order of Australia
World Bank people
Michigan State University faculty
Australian expatriates in the United States
Writers from South Australia
20th-century Australian male writers
21st-century Australian male writers
20th-century Australian  economists
21st-century Australian economists